Anabrissus damesi is a species of sea urchin of the family Brissidae. Their armour is covered with spines. It is placed in the genus Anabrissus and lives in the sea. Anabrissus damesi was first scientifically described in 1881 by Alexander Agassiz, American scientist and engineer.

See also 
Amphipneustes similis (Mortensen, 1936)
Amphipneustes tumescens (Koehler, 1926)
Anametalia grandis (Mortensen, 1950)

References 

Brissidae
Animals described in 1881
Taxa named by Alexander Agassiz